Waragi (pronounced , also known as kasese) is a generic term in Uganda for domestic distilled beverages. Waragi is also given different names, depending on region of origin, the distillation process, or both. Waragi is known as a form of homemade Gin. The term "Waragi" is synonymous with locally distilled gin in all parts of Uganda. However, Uganda Waragi is a particular brand of industrially distilled gin produced by East African Breweries Limited. Other brands of distilled gin which are done by individuals at small scale are also available, but they are also unique and different from each other. The most common are: 1. "Kasese-Kasese" which was originally distilled in the district of Kasese in western Uganda and sold all over the country; 2. "Lira-Lira" which first originated in Lira district in northern Uganda and sold all over the country as well. These two brands "waragi" have different tastes and scents from each other. The distillation process in both cases produce highly distilled gin at the level produced industrially.

Moonshining and consumption of waragi and other alcoholic beverages is widespread in Uganda. In the 2004 WHO Global Status Report on Alcohol, Uganda ranked as the world's leading consumer of alcohol (per capita). Based on results from 2007, Uganda’s overall alcohol consumption was an average of 17.6 liters per capita. This is unusually high compared to surrounding countries. In 2016 this seems no longer the case, with total consumption of pure alcohol down to 9.5 litres per capita (≥ 15 years of age).

History
The history of waragi in Uganda can be traced to the period of Ugandan history during the colonial era. Gins were introduced to Uganda by British soldiers who were stationed in the Uganda Protectorate, and soon became a popular drink among Ugandans. In 1960, the colonial government passed the Liquor Act, which implemented limitations on the production and consumption of locally produced gins in the colony. Although the act was ostensibly passed in order to prevent Ugandans from experiencing negative health effects as a result of the dangerous production methods of moonshining, economic motivations were also in play; the colonial government wished to ensure the dominance of imported gins from Britain in the Ugandan alcohol market, which was being undercut by local gin production via moonshiners. Locally produced gin quickly proved more popular than those imported from Britain, thanks in part due to their cheaper prices. Ugandan politicians, led by the Uganda People's Congress (UPC), protested the act, arguing that the colonial government should have instead ordered the construction of a distillery factory in the colony so Ugandans who desired gin would not resort to the dangerous practice of moonshining. When the UPC came to power, it ordered the construction of a distillery factory, naming the gin produced there Uganda Waragi. The factory was staffed with a group of 26 blenders who formed the Association of Uganda Distillers and Vitners, which was headed by master blender Joel Sentamu.

After Ugandan independence in 1962, the government of Uganda passed the Enguli Act of 1965, which was designed to encourage local producers of enguli to supply their produce to the distillery factory, in addition to stipulating that moonshining could only be done with government-issued licenses; this was done so the gin industry in Uganda could be regulated and taxed by the government. Furthermore, those who received their licenses from the Ugandan government were directed to sell their enguli to the distillery. When the factory received shipments of enguli, they used them in the production of Uganda Waragi.

Waragi derives its name from "war gin", as the British expatriates in the 1950s and 1960s referred to the distilled spirit known in Luganda language as enguli. Its appearance first came about when the British were first starting to establish control over East Africa. They used brigades of Sudanese colonial soldiers to help with the feat, and they concocted the alcohol to help keep up good spirits amongst the troops. It then spread throughout Uganda as a well-known drink. Another theory is that the name is a corruption of "Arak" the North African spirit with which the Nubian soldiers would have been familiar.

The colonial authorities of Uganda banned the drink and the laws still exist today. Africans at the time would not drink it publicly because drinks that were less harmful to them were also off limits then.

In 1965, "The Enguli Act" decreed that distillation would only be possible under licence, and that distillers should sell their product to the government run Uganda Distilleries Ltd – which produced a branded bottled product, marketed under the name Uganda Waragi (distilled from millet and today wholly produced by East African Breweries Limited). "The Enguli Act" was never successfully enforced, as unlicensed production of waragi persisted.

People in Uganda now drink the harsh gin and authorities overall ignore the law and do not enforce it regularly. It is sold in shops and bars across Uganda and a distilled version is sold overseas. The product that is sold overseas is double and sometimes triple distilled from the alcohol that village distillers make for the factories in Uganda. When it is distilled, flavors are added and many impurities and dangerous parts of the alcohol are filtered out.

Incidents
In April 2010, 80 people died from multiple organ dysfunction syndrome after drinking waragi adulterated with a high amount of methanol over a three-week period in Kabale District. Many of the deaths were blamed on the reluctance of people to openly admit their relatives had been drinking it, allowing the abuse of the substance to continue. When revelations came about houses were searched, with around 120 jerrycans uncovered.

The death toll of 80 was arrived at after 15 people died in the period between April 23 and the weekend before. Deaths in Kamwenge went from five to nine after four people died on 21 April. Two people were hospitalised at Kamwenge's Ntara Health Centre IV and five were hospitalised at Mbarara Regional Referral Hospital.

BBC correspondent Joshua Mmali described it as "the largest number killed at one time for several years."

Process

VICE, a news outlet known for "immersion journalism" devoted an episode of their web series Fringes to the process of making and distributing Waragi. The episode also covered the cultural significance of Waragi in Uganda, with reporter Thomas Morton imbibing various distillations of the traditional beverage.
Waragi can be brewed from bananas.

Variants
The base of waragi distillate can be made from either cassava, bananas, millet or sugar cane, depending on the crops grown in the region. The most popular (besides the branded Uganda Waragi) are Lira Lira and Kasese. Lira Lira is made mainly from cassava flour and cane sugar, and is named after the town of Lira. Kasese, named after the town of Kasese, is a potent banana gin. Waragi may also be known as "regular" or "super."

Availability
Close to 80% of the Waragi today is made in Uganda. A large glass of this unregulated liquor goes for approximately 25 cents, making it easily accessible for Ugandans.

See also

Changaa (in Kenya)

References

External links
Drinking alcohol in East Africa

Ugandan cuisine
Alcohol in Uganda
Distilled drinks
Adulteration